The 2021 U.S. Poker Open was the third edition of the U.S. Poker Open, a series of high-stakes poker tournaments held at Aria Resort and Casino in Las Vegas, Nevada. The series was held from June 3-15, with 12 scheduled events culminating in a $50,000 No-Limit Hold'em tournament. The player who earned the most points throughout the series was crowned the champion, earning $50,000 and the Golden Eagle trophy.

David Peters won three events and cashed four times to win the series championship for the second consecutive time. Sean Winter won the Main Event and finished second in the overall standings, also for the second straight time.

Schedule

Series leaderboard

Results

Event #1: $10,000 No-Limit Hold'em

 2-Day Event: June 3-4
 Number of Entries: 95
 Total Prize Pool: $950,000
 Number of Payouts: 14
 Winning Hand:

Event #2: $10,000 Pot-Limit Omaha

 2-Day Event: June 4-5
 Number of Entries: 65
 Total Prize Pool: $650,000
 Number of Payouts: 10
 Winning Hand:

Event #3: $10,000 No-Limit Hold'em

 2-Day Event: June 5-6
 Number of Entries: 77
 Total Prize Pool: $770,000
 Number of Payouts: 11
 Winning Hand:

Event #4: $10,000 Big Bet Mix

 2-Day Event: June 6-7
 Number of Entries: 48
 Total Prize Pool: $480,000
 Number of Payouts: 7
 Winning Hand:  (2-7 Single Draw)

Event #5: $10,000 No-Limit Hold'em

 2-Day Event: June 7-8
 Number of Entries: 85
 Total Prize Pool: $850,000
 Number of Payouts: 13
 Winning Hand:

Event #6: $10,000 8-Game

 2-Day Event: June 8-9
 Number of Entries: 68
 Total Prize Pool: $680,000
 Number of Payouts: 10
 Winning Hand:  /  /  (Stud 8)

Event #7: $10,000 No-Limit Hold'em

 2-Day Event: June 9-10
 Number of Entries: 99
 Total Prize Pool: $990,000
 Number of Payouts: 15
 Winning Hand:

Event #8: $10,000 Pot-Limit Omaha

 2-Day Event: June 10-11
 Number of Entries: 63
 Total Prize Pool: $630,000
 Number of Payouts: 9
 Winning Hand:

Event #9: $10,000 No-Limit Hold'em

 2-Day Event: June 11-12
 Number of Entries: 99
 Total Prize Pool: $990,000
 Number of Payouts: 15
 Winning Hand:

Event #10: $10,000 Short Deck

 2-Day Event: June 12-13
 Number of Entries: 27
 Total Prize Pool: $270,000
 Number of Payouts: 4
 Winning Hand:

Event #11: $25,000 No-Limit Hold'em

 2-Day Event: June 13-14
 Number of Entries: 69
 Total Prize Pool: $1,725,000
 Number of Payouts: 10
 Winning Hand:

Event #12: $50,000 No-Limit Hold'em

 2-Day Event: June 14-15
 Number of Entries: 42
 Total Prize Pool: $2,100,000
 Number of Payouts: 6
 Winning Hand:

Leaders

References

External links
 Official website

2021 in poker
2021 in sports in Nevada
Television shows about poker
Poker tournaments